The secretary of finance is the cabinet of the Philippines member in charge of the Department of Finance.

The current secretary is Benjamin Diokno, who assumed office on June 30, 2022.

List of secretaries of finance

External links
DOF website

 
Finance